David Dyson may refer to:

 David Dyson (musician) (born 1965), American bassist, songwriter, arranger, and producer
 David Dyson (businessman) (born 1970), chief executive of Three UK
 David J. Dyson (1863–1949), mayor of Winnipeg, Manitoba